Autumn Hill was a Canadian country music duo composed of Mike Robins (from Toronto, Ontario) and Tareya Green (from Calgary, Alberta).

History

Green studied multi-media at Southern Alberta Institute of Technology in Calgary, Alberta and was developing websites for entertainers, but she was a songwriter and pianist and began posting performances on YouTube, where Wax Records co-founder Jamie Appleby discovered her. In January 2012, she moved to Toronto, where Appleby brought in several songwriters to co-write what was meant to be her first album. One of those songwriters was Mike Robins. Robins was an established singer/songwriter who had spent 2010 touring with Hope Sandoval then had his 2011 solo single "No Mercy" top the adult contemporary chart on iHeartRadio. When Appleby heard the two singing together, he saw their potential as a duet and Autumn Hill was born.

Their debut single, "Anything At All," entered the Canadian Hot 100 in January 2013. It is included on their debut album Favourite Mistake, released September 10, 2013. With two of their singles gaining substantial airplay on both country and adult contemporary formats, the pair were touted as the first Canadian country act since Shania Twain to successfully crossover to pop radio. The record's three subsequent singles experienced diminishing returns on the Canada Country airplay chart; the third single "Fire" became the group's highest-charting entry on the Canadian Hot 100 at number 73. "Blame" was released in March 2015 as the lead single for the group's second and final album, Anchor. Reaching a peak position of four on the Canadian country airplay chart, it remains the group's only top ten hit. In total, seven of their singles charted.

In 2017, at the end of their promotion for Anchor, the pair decided to split up and pursue solo careers. 

Green adopted the mononym 'Tareya' and released her debut solo single, "Summer Wheels", in June 2017. In March 2018, she released her debut album, Stained Glass Heart. Robins co-founded the band East Adelaide and, in October 2020, released the solo single "Lightning Don’t Strike Twice".

Discography

Studio albums

Singles

Christmas singles

Guest singles

Music videos

Awards and nominations

References

External links

Canadian country music groups
Country music duos
Musical groups established in 2012
Musical groups disestablished in 2016
Canadian musical duos
2012 establishments in Canada